Smiling Jim is a 1922 American silent Western film directed by Joseph J. Franz from a screenplay by Hal C. Norfleet. The film stars Franklyn Farnum, Alma Bennett, and Percy Challenger.

Cast
 Franklyn Farnum as Smiling Jim/Frank Harmon
 Alma Bennett as Louise Briggs
 Percy Challenger as Judd Briggs
 Al Ferguson as Sheriff Thomas

References

1922 films
1922 Western (genre) films
1920s English-language films
American black-and-white films
Silent American Western (genre) films
1920s American films